Breakin' All the Rules is a 2004 American comedy film. It was directed and written by Daniel Taplitz. It stars Jamie Foxx, Morris Chestnut, Jennifer Esposito, Peter MacNicol and Gabrielle Union.

Plot
Quincy Watson (Jamie Foxx) is unceremoniously dumped by his fiancée Helen (Bianca Lawson) during their engagement party. Devastated, he attempts to express his feelings to her with a heartfelt letter. His boss, Phillip (Peter MacNicol), has also given him the job of researching how to diplomatically lay off people at their company. As Quincy writes, the letter becomes a "how to" book on the correct way to end a relationship. He has a book published and becomes a best-selling author on the subject. Not wanting his male friends to suffer the same fate, he gives them advice on dumping their mates including Phillip, who is trying to break up with his gold-digger girlfriend Rita (Jennifer Esposito). After his cousin Evan (Morris Chestnut) reads Quincy's book he starts to question his relationship with his girlfriend Nicky (Gabrielle Union).

Mistakenly believing that Nicky wants to break up with him, Evan goes to his cousin Quincy and asks him to talk to her, hopefully convincing her that Evan's a good guy. Since Quincy has never met her, he does not know what she looks like so Evan tells him that she has long, black hair. (As it turns out, that day, Nicky had cut her hair to a short length she described as being like Halle Berry). Quincy and Nicky end up sitting next to each other at the bar where Nicky was supposed to meet Evan. Quincy tells her that he is looking for his cousin's ex-girlfriend Nicky who has long black hair.

Knowing that Quincy is Evan's cousin, Nicky lies and tells Quincy her name is Mary. During the time Quincy and Nicky are at the bar, Rita finds out that Philip is planning to break up with her. She goes to Quincy's house but when she gets there Evan lies and says that he's Quincy. The two begin an affair. Later, Evan goes to Nicky's house to break up with her, only to find that she was going to do the same, and has been seeing another man.

Changing his mind, Evan goes to Quincy's job and tells him that he thinks he is in love with Nicky, and that she has been seeing another man. During that conversation, Quincy realizes that 'Mary' is actually Nicky. At the party for Quincy's hot seller book, Helen is just back from Paris and has decided she wants to get back with Quincy. Evan had planned on proposing to Nicky at the party but finds out that Quincy is dating his ex-girlfriend. He becomes upset with him and leaves the party to look for Nicky.  The next day, Evan talks to Quincy and tells him he will marry Rita. Phillip had a heart attack, and at the hospital, Rita finds out that Evan lied to her. Instead of getting mad, she says she fell in love with him. Quincy breaks up with Helen and goes to look for Nicky. When he goes to her door, her neighbor tells him that she's leaving for Portland by train. He goes to look for her. As the train is speeding away he confesses his love for her and they both ride the train to Portland.

Cast
 Jamie Foxx as Quincy Watson
 Peter MacNicol as Philip Gascon
 Morris Chestnut as Evan Fields
 Gabrielle Union as Nicky Callas
 Jennifer Esposito as Rita Monroe
 Bianca Lawson as Helen Sharp
 Jill Ritchie as Amy
 Danny Comden as Sam

Reception
Breakin' All the Rules was received negatively by critics. 33% of critics on Rotten Tomatoes gave the film a positive review; the consensus reading: "This formulaic screwball comedy is weighed down by a contrived, overly complicated plot."

The film opened at #5 in its opening weekend at the box office, ultimately grossing $12,544,254 worldwide.

References

External links 
 

2004 films
2004 romantic comedy films
Screen Gems films
African-American romantic comedy films
2000s English-language films
2000s American films